Sincheon station is a station on the Seohae Line in South Korea.  It opened on June 16, 2018.

Seoul Metropolitan Subway stations
Metro stations in Siheung
Railway stations opened in 2018